Capitella is a polychaete worm genus in the family Capitellidae.

Species 
 Capitella aberranta
 Capitella capitata
 Capitella caribaeorum
 Capitella dizonata
 Capitella giardi
 Capitella gracilis
 Capitella hermaphrodita
 Capitella intermedia
 Capitella jonesi
 Capitella minima
 Capitella ovincola
 Capitella perarmata
 Capitella perarmatus
 Capitella singularis
 Capitella teleta
 Capitella tripartita

References

External links

Polychaete genera